Intergenerational equity in economic, psychological, and sociological contexts, is the idea of fairness or justice between generations. The concept can be applied to fairness in dynamics between children, youth, adults, and seniors. It can also be applied to fairness between generations currently living and future generations.

Conversations about intergenerational equity occur across several fields. It is often discussed in public economics, especially with regard to transition economics, social policy, and government budget-making. Many cite the growing U.S. national debt as an example of intergenerational inequity, as future generations will shoulder the consequences. Intergenerational equity is also explored in environmental concerns, including sustainable development, and climate change. The continued depletion of natural resources that has occurred in the past century will likely be a significant burden for future generations. Intergenerational equity is also discussed with regard to standards of living, specifically on inequities in the living standards experienced by people of different ages and generations. Intergenerational equity issues also arise in the arenas of elderly care and social justice.

Power 
The youth suffrage movement includes some advocating for the equal distribution of power to all, regardless of age so that they can influence their short and long-term priorities. The lowest voting age, as of January 2023, is 16. 

Future generations, if they are going to be given any power, would need some form of proxy voting. Kim Stanley Robinson describes one such system in his science fiction novel The Ministry for the Future.

Public economics usage

History 
Since the first recorded debt issuance in Sumaria in 1796 BC, one of the penalties for failure to repay a loan has been debt bondage. In some instances, this repayment of financial debt with labor included the debtor's children, essentially condemning the debtor family to perpetual slavery. About one millennium after written debt contracts were created, the concept of debt forgiveness appears in the Old Testament, called Jubilee (Leviticus 25), and in Greek law when Solon introduces Seisachtheia. Both of these historical examples of debt forgiveness involved freeing children from slavery caused by their parents' debt.

While slavery is illegal in all countries today, North Korea has a policy called, "Three Generations of Punishment" which has been documented by Shin Dong-hyuk and used as an example of punishing children for parents' mistakes. Stanley Druckenmiller and Geoffrey Canada have applied this concept (calling it "Generational Theft") to the large increase in government debt being left by the Baby Boomers to their children.

Investment management 
In the context of institutional investment management, intergenerational equity is the principle that an endowed institution's spending rate must not exceed its after-inflation rate of compound return, so that investment gains are spent equally on current and future constituents of the endowed assets. This concept was originally set out in 1974 by economist James Tobin, who wrote that "The trustees of endowed institutions are the guardians of the future against the claims of the present. Their task in managing the endowment is to preserve equity among generations."

In an economical context intergenerational equity refers to the relationship that a particular family has with resources. An example is the forest-dwelling civilians in Papua New Guinea, who for generations have lived in a certain part of the forest which thus becomes their land. The adult population sell the trees for palm oil to make money. If they cannot make a sustainable development on managing their resources, their next or future generations will lose this resource.

U.S. national debt 

One debate about the national debt relates to intergenerational equity. If one generation is receiving the benefit of government programs or employment that is enabled by deficit spending and debt accumulation, to what extent does the resulting higher debt impose risks and costs on future generations? There are several factors to consider:
For every dollar of debt held by the public, there is a government obligation (generally marketable Treasury securities) counted as an asset by investors. Future generations benefit to the extent these assets are passed on to them, which by definition must correspond to the level of debt passed on.
As of 2010, approximately 72% of financial assets were held by the wealthiest 5% of the population. This presents a wealth and income distribution question, as only a fraction of the people in future generations will receive principal or interest from investments related to the debt incurred today. 
To the extent the U.S. debt is owed to foreign investors (approximately half the "debt held by the public" during 2012), principal and interest are not directly received by U.S. heirs. 
Higher debt levels imply higher interest payments, which create costs for future taxpayers (e.g., higher taxes, lower government benefits, higher inflation, or increased risk of fiscal crisis).
To the extent that borrowed funds are invested today to improve the long-term productivity of the economy and its workers, such as via useful infrastructure projects, future generations may benefit.
For every dollar of intragovernmental debt, there is an obligation to specific program recipients, generally non-marketable securities such as those held in the Social Security Trust Fund. Adjustments that reduce future deficits in these programs may also apply costs to future generations, via higher taxes or lower program spending.

Economist Paul Krugman wrote in March 2013 that by neglecting public investment and failing to create jobs, we are doing far more harm to future generations than merely passing along debt: "Fiscal policy is, indeed, a moral issue, and we should be ashamed of what we’re doing to the next generation's economic prospects. But our sin involves investing too little, not borrowing too much." Young workers face high unemployment and studies have shown their income may lag throughout their careers as a result. Teacher jobs have been cut, which could affect the quality of education and competitiveness of younger Americans.

Australian politician Christine Milne made similar statements in the lead-up to the 2014 Carbon Price Repeal Bill, naming the Liberal National Party (elected to parliament in 2013) and inherently its ministers, as intergenerational thieves; her statement was based on the party's attempts to roll back progressive carbon tax policy and the impact this would have on the intergenerational equity of future generations.

U.S. Social Security 
The U.S. Social Security system has provided a greater net benefit to those who reached retirement closest to the first implementation of the system. The system is unfunded, meaning the elderly who retired right after the implementation of the system did not pay any taxes into the social security system, but reaped the benefits. Professor Michael Doran estimates that cohorts born previous to 1938 will receive more in benefits than they pay in taxes, while the reverse is true to cohorts born after. Also, that the long-term insolvency of Social Security will likely lead to further intergenerational transfers. However, Broad concedes that other benefits have been introduced into U.S. society via the welfare system, like Medicare and government-financed medical research, that benefit current and future elderly cohorts.

Environmental usage 

 
Intergenerational equity is often referred to in environmental contexts, as younger age cohorts will disproportionately experience the negative consequences of environmental damage. For instance, it is estimated that children born in 2020 (e.g. "Generation Alpha") will experience 2–7 as many extreme weather events over their lifetimes, particularly heat waves, compared to people born in 1960, under current climate policy pledges. Moreover, on average,  played "a leading role in driving up GHG emissions in the past decade and are on the way to becoming the largest contributor" due to factors such as demographic transition,  and high expenditures on carbon-intensive products like energy which is used i.a. for heating rooms and private transport.

Ethical perspectives on amelioration 

Two perspectives have been proposed on what should be done to ameliorate environmental intergenerational equity: the "weak sustainability" perspective and the "strong sustainability" perspective. From the "weak" perspective, intergenerational equity would be achieved if losses to the environment that future generations face were offset by gains in economic progress (as measured by contemporary mechanisms/metrics). From the "strong" perspective, no amount of economic progress (or as measured by contemporary metrics) can justify leaving future generations with a degraded environment. According to Professor Sharon Beder, the "weak" perspective is undermined by a lack of knowledge of the future, as we do not know which intrinsically valuable resources will not be able to be replaced by technology. We also do not know to what extent environmental damage is irreversible. Further, more harm cannot be avoided to many species of plants and animals. 

Other scholars contest Beder's point of view. Professor Wilfred Beckerman insists that "strong sustainability" is "morally repugnant", particularly when it overrides other moral concerns about those alive today. Beckerman insists that the optimal choice for society is to prioritize the welfare of current generations – albeit, depending e.g. on lifespans, these are also affected by unsustainability – above future generations. He suggests placing a discount rate on outcomes for future generations when accounting for generational equity. Beckerman is extensively criticized by Brian Barry and Nicholas Vrousalis. 

Still others have criticized the economistic foundations of environmental debates about intergenerational equity and longtermism. For example, anthropologist Vincent Ialenti has called for a "more textured, multifaceted, multidimensional longtermism that defies insular information silos and disciplinary echo chambers."

Climate-related lawsuit  

In September 2015, a group of youth environmental activists filed a lawsuit against the U.S. federal government for insufficiently protecting against climate change: Juliana v. United States. Their statement emphasized the disproportionate cost of climate-related damage younger generations would bear: “Youth Plaintiffs represent the youngest living generation, beneficiaries of the public trust. Youth Plaintiffs have a substantial, direct, and immediate interest in protecting the atmosphere, other vital natural resources, their quality of life, their property interests, and their liberties. They also have an interest in ensuring that the climate system remains stable enough to secure their constitutional rights to life, liberty, and property, rights that depend on a livable Future.” In November 2016, the case was allowed to go to trial after US District Court Judge Ann Aiken denied the federal government’s motion to dismiss the case. In her opinion and order, she said, "Exercising my ‘reasoned judgment,’ I have no doubt that the right to a climate system capable of sustaining human life is fundamental to a free and ordered society." As of April 2017, the trial was put on hold with a stay. The Ninth Circuit heard oral arguments on the stay in November of 2017 and a ruling is expected in February of 2018.

Standards of living usage 

Discussions of intergenerational equity in standards of living reference differences between people of different ages or of different generations. Two perspectives on intergenerational equity in living standards have been distinguished by Rice, Temple, and McDonald. The first perspective – a "cross-sectional" perspective – focuses how living standards at a particular point in time vary between people of different ages. The relevant issue is the degree to which, at a particular point in time, people of different ages enjoy equal living standards. The second perspective – a "cohort" perspective – focuses on how living standards over a lifetime vary between people of different generations. For intergenerational equity, the relevant issue becomes the degree to which people of different generations enjoy equal living standards over their lifetimes.

Three indicators of intergenerational equity in standards of living have been proposed by d'Albis, Badji, El Mekkaoui, and Navaux. Their first indicator originates from a cross-sectional perspective and describes the relative situation of an age group (retirees) with respect to the situation of another age group (younger people). Their second indicator originates from a cohort perspective and compares the living standards of successive generations at the same age. D'Albis, Badji, El Mekkaoui, and Navaux's third indicator is a combination of the two previous criteria and is both an inter-age indicator and an intergenerational indicator. Further indicators of intergenerational equity have been developed by Rice, Temple, McDonald, and Wilson.

In Australia, notable equality has been achieved in living standards, as measured by consumption, among people between the ages of 20 and 75 years. Substantial inequalities exist, however, between different generations, with older generations experiencing lower living standards in real terms at particular ages than younger generations. One way to illustrate these inequalities is to look at how long different generations took to achieve a level of consumption of $30,000 per year (2009–10 Australian dollars). At one extreme, people born in 1935 achieved this level of consumption when they were roughly 50 years of age, on average. At the other extreme, Millennials born in 1995 had achieved this level of consumption by the time they were around 10 years of age.

Considerations such as this have led some scholars to argue that standards of living have tended to increase generation over generation in most countries, as development and technology have progressed. When taking this into account, younger generations may have inherent privileges over older generations, which may offset the redistribution of wealth towards older generations.

Elderly care usage 

Other scholars express different opinions on which generation is disadvantaged by elderly care. Professor Steven Wisensale describes the burden on current working age adults in developed economies, who must care for more elderly parents and relatives for a longer period of time. This problem is exacerbated by the increasing involvement of women in the workforce, and by the dropping fertility rate, leaving the burden for caring for parents, as well as aunts, uncles, and grandparents, on fewer children. In systems with weak social security systems, this also impacts the wellbeing of the elderly who may have fewer caretakers than are optimal.

Social justice usage 

Conversations about intergenerational equity are also relevant to social justice arenas, where issues such as health care spark conversations about youth rights and youth voice. There is a strong interest within the legal community towards the application of intergenerational equity in law.

Advocacy groups 

Generation Squeeze is a Canadian not-for-profit organization that advocates for intergenerational equity.

See also 

Adultism
Ageism
Environmental ethics
Environmental racism
Evolving capacities
Fear of children
Fear of the elderly
Fear of youth
Future generations
Generational accounting
Gerontocracy
Inter-generational contract
Justice (economics)
Longtermism
Proxy voting
Transgenerational design
Weak and strong sustainability
Youth rights
Youth-adult partnerships

References

Further reading 

Bishop, R (1978) "Endangered Species and Uncertainty: The Economics of a Safe Minimum Standard", American Journal of Agricultural Economics, 60 p10-18.
Brown-Weiss, E (1989) In Fairness to Future Generations: International Law, Common Patrimony and Intergenerational Equity. Dobbs Ferry, NY: Transitional Publishers, Inc., for the United Nations University, Tokyo.
Daly, H. (1977) Steady State Economics: The Economics of Biophysiscal Equilibrium and Moral Growth. San Francisco: W. H. Freeman and Co.
Frischmann, B. (2005) "Some Thoughts on Shortsightedness and Intergenerational Equity", Loyola University Chicago Law Journal, 36.
Goldberg, M (1989) On Systemic Balance: Flexibility and Stability In Social, Economic, and Environmental Systems. New York: Praeger.
Howarth, R. & Norgaard, R.B. (1990) "Intergenerational Resource Rights, Efficiency, and Social Optimality", Land Economics, 66(1) p1-11.
Laslett, P. & Fishkin, J. (1992) Justice Between Age Groups and Generations. New Haven, CT: Yale University Press.
Portney, P. & Weyant, J. P. (1999) Discounting and Intergenerational Equity. Washington, DC: Resources for the Future Press.
McLean, D. "Intergenerational Equity" in White, J. (Ed) (1999) Clobal Climate Change: Linking Energy, Environment, Economy, and Equity. Plenum Press.
Sikora, R.I. & Barry, B. (1978) Obligations to Future Generations. Philadelphia, PA: Temple University Press.
Tabellini, G. (1991) "The Politics of Intergenerational Redistribution", Journal of Political Economy, 99(2) p335-358.
Thompson, Dennis F. (2011) "Representing Future Generations: Political Presentism and Democratic Trusteeship," in Democracy, Equality, and Justice, eds. Matt Matravers and Lukas Meyer, pp. 17–37. 
Vrousalis, N. (2016). "Intergenerational Justice: A Primer". in Gosseries and Gonzalez (2016) (eds). Institutions for Future Generations. Oxford University Press, 49-64
Wiess-Brown, Margaret. "Chapter 12. Intergenerational equity: a legal framework for global environmental change" in Wiess-Brown, M. (1992) Environmental change and international law: New challenges and dimensions. United Nations University Press.
Willetts, D. (2010). The pinch: How the baby boomers took their children's future and why they should give it back. London: Atlantic Books.

External links 
Intergenerational Justice (Stanford Encyclopedia of Philosophy)

Ageism
Ageing
Youth rights
Identity politics
Cultural generations
Welfare economics